Teriberskaya Volost was an administrative division (a volost) of Alexandrovsky Uyezd of Arkhangelsk Governorate, Russian Empire (and later of the Russian SFSR), and then of Murmansk Governorate of the Russian SFSR.

It was established on  1912, from a part of Kolsko-Loparskaya Volost.

On 22 April 1920 the Soviet of the town of Alexandrovsk proposed to incorporate several colonies of Teriberskaya Volost into new Alexandrovskaya Volost. The proposal was formally approved by Murmansky Uyezd Executive Committee on 1 June 1920.

The volost became a part of Murmansk Governorate at the time of its establishment in 1921, and was abolished on 1 August 1927, along with the rest of the volosts of Murmansk Governorate, when the latter was transformed into Murmansk Okrug, redistricted, and transferred to the newly created Leningrad Oblast.

References

Notes

Sources

Arkhangelsk Governorate volosts
States and territories established in 1912
States and territories disestablished in 1927
1912 establishments in the Russian Empire